Joseph C. Schubert (1871–1959) was Mayor of Madison, Wisconsin. He held the office from 1906 to 1911. Schubert was a Democrat.

References

Mayors of Madison, Wisconsin
Wisconsin Democrats
1871 births
1959 deaths